Federico Augusto Boyd López (24 September 1851 – 25 May 1924) was acting President of Panama from October 1, 1910 to October 5, 1910. He belonged to the Liberal Party.

Boyd was born in Panama City on September 24, 1851. He was the son of Archibaldo B. Boyd and Maria Lopez de Boyd. He was a businessman who became an active member of the Patriotic Revolutionary Junta that struggled to get Panama's independence from Colombia. He fought in favor of his country without thinking of the danger of the actions he undertook. He served in several positions: member of the Panama City Town Hall (1888); member of the Provisional Government Junta (1903); National Assembly senator (1910); head of state of Panama (1910); foreign relations minister (1911–1912); ambassador and minister in Germany, Netherlands, and Belgium; general consul; and business representative in Honduras and El Salvador.

He was elected as the second presidential designate by the National Assembly for the term 1906–1908. He was elected as the second presidential designate for the term 1910–1912, and as the first presidential designate for the term 1920–1922.

His talent as public speaker brought him to represent Panama's interests before the Colombian Government. He presented a petition to obtain a delay on the negotiations with the French Government to build a Panama Canal. Later on, his intervention made possible a negotiation with the U.S. Government for the construction of an interoceanic canal through the Isthmus of Panama.

Boyd died in New York City on May 25, 1924. He is remembered as one of the founding fathers of Panama.

References

• Mellander, Gustavo A., Mellander, Nelly, Charles Edward Magoon: The Panama Years. Río Piedras, Puerto Rico: Editorial Plaza Mayor. ISBN 1-56328-155-4. OCLC 42970390. (1999)

• Mellander, Gustavo A., The United States in Panamanian Politics: The Intriguing Formative Years." Danville, Ill.: Interstate Publishers. OCLC 138568. (1971)

1851 births
1924 deaths
People from Panama City
Presidents of Panama
Vice presidents of Panama
National Liberal Party (Panama) politicians
Ambassadors of Panama to Germany
Ambassadors of Panama to the Netherlands
Ambassadors of Panama to Belgium
Government ministers of Panama
Members of the National Assembly (Panama)
Panamanian businesspeople